Padaba Radio (99.3 FM) is a radio station owned and operated by Lann's Radio Media Network. Its studios and transmitter are located at Sampaguita Village, Brgy. San Juan, Roro, Sorsogon City.

History
The station was established in 2009 on Our Lady's Foundation-owned 103.9 FM. In 2017, it transferred to Allied Broadcasting Center-owned 99.9 FM. In March 2022, it migrated its operations online, with Wow Smile Radio taking over the station's frequency, it moved from 99.9 FM to 99.3 FM.

References

Radio stations in Sorsogon
Radio stations established in 2009